North Frontenac is a township in Frontenac County in eastern Ontario, Canada.

History 
North Frontenac was created in 1998 by the amalgamation of three municipalities: the Township of Barrie; the Township of Clarendon and Miller; and the Township of Palmerston, North and South Canonto.

Geography 
North Frontenac is in the heart of Eastern Ontario's cottage country. Cottages and campsites dot the shores of the Township's many clean lakes. Located entirely on the Canadian Shield, the landscape can often be rough and unpredictable, but at the same time provides scenic vistas. Residents, both permanent and seasonal, enjoy a wide variety of outdoor activities. The Township is bordered by Greater Madawaska to the north, Addington Highlands to the west, Central Frontenac to the south and Lanark Highlands to the east.

Communities

The township includes the communities of Ardoch, Beatty, Beech Corners, Canonto, Coxvale, Donaldson, Fernleigh, Harlowe, Mississippi Station, Myers Cave, Ompah, Plevna, Robertsville, Snow Road Station and Wilbur.

Lakes 
Lakes of notable size within the Township's borders are:

Dark-Sky Preserve status
On August 3, 2013, North Frontenac became the first municipality in Canada to achieve Dark Sky Preserve Status by the Royal Astronomical Society of Canada.

Demographics 

Mother tongue:
 English as first language: 94.5%
 French as first language: 1.8%
 Other as first language: 3.7%

Parks 

The municipality is host to Bon Echo Provincial Park (shared with Addington Highlands) and the North Frontenac Parklands.

Local government 
North Frontenac is governed by a mayor, a deputy mayor (who serves as both deputy mayor and councilor) and five councilors. Each municipal ward is represented by two councilors. The Mayor and one other member of Council represent the municipality on the Frontenac County Council.

Current government: 

 Mayor: Gerry Lichty
 Deputy Mayor: John Inglis
 Councilors:
 Ward 1: Wayne Good
 Ward 1: Stephanie Regent
 Ward 2: Vernon Hermer
 Ward 2: Roy Huetl
 Ward 3: Fred Fowler
 Ward 3: John Inglis

List of former mayors 
Mayors of the Township of North Frontenac:

 2015–2022: RON HIGGINS
 2010–2014: BUD CLAYTON
 2003–2010: RON MAGUIRE
 1998–2003: STAN JOHNSON

Pre-Amalgamation 
Reeves of the former Township of Barrie

 1873–1873: T. TAPPING
 1874–1874: D. KENYON
 1875–1875: D. KENYON
 1876–1878: T. TAPPING
 1879–1881: R. SCOTT
 1882–1882: T. TAPPING
 1883–1883: R. TAPPING
 1884–1886: A. WICKWARE
 1887–1887: Wm. DEMPSEY
 1888–1893: T. TAPPING
 1894–1894: G. DELINE
 1895–1895: G. DELINE
 1896–1896: Wm. SALMOND
 1897–1897: G. DELINE
 1898–1898: J. MITCHELL
 1899–1899: J. MITCHELL
 1900–1900: G. DELINE / Wm. SALMOND
 1901–1904: Wm. SALMOND
 1905–1905: G. DELINE
 1906–1906: G. DELINE
 1907–1909: C. MACGREGOR
 1910–1913: Wm. SALMOND
 1914–1917: J. GRAY
 1918–1926: C. MACGREGOR
 1927–1933: S. WHEELER
 1934–1942: H. LEVERE
 1943–1951: A. MACGREGOR
 1952–1952: A. HILLIER
 1953–1957: J. HEAD
 1958–1966: J. HILL
 1967–1988: T. NEAL
 1989–1990: W. VAN KEMPEN
 1991–1997: T. NEAL
Reeves of the former Township of Clarendon and Miller

 1865–1882: B. WATKINS.  (one of the first settlers in Clarendon) 
 1883–1885: J. HOWELL
 1886–1891: J. HOWELL
 1892–1892: B. WATKINS
 1893–1896: A. MONROE
 1897–1900: J.F. CARD
 1901–1901: B. WATKINS
 1902–1904: J. MCDONALD
 1905–1905: S.S. BARTON
 1906–1906: J. MCDONALD
 1907–1907: J. MCDONALD
 1908–1912: J.D. GODKIN
 1913–1913: J.F. CARD
 1914–1914: J.F. CARD
 1915–1919: P.J. WENSLEY
 1920–1922: T. ARMSTRONG
 1923–1928: J. FLAKE
 1929–1931: J. BROUSE
 1932–1934: J. FLAKE
 1935–1951: L. KRING
 1952–1954: C. ARMSTRONG
 1955–1955: L. KRING
 1956–1956: G. KRING
 1957–1957: C. ARMSTRONG
 1958–1974: G. KRING
 1975–1984: WM. FLIELER
 1985–1997: S. JOHNSTON

Reeves of the former Township of Palmerston, North and South Canonto.

 1896–1901: J. MCKENZIE
 1902–1902: P. WHITE
 1903–1903: J. MOORE
 1904–1904: R. WOOD
 1905–1905: WM. MILLAR
 1906–1908: D. WOOD
 1909–1909: WM. DONALDSON
 1910–1910: D. WOOD
 1911–1915: WM. DONALDSON
 1916–1924: D. GEMMILL
 1925–1932: S.J. SHANKS
 1933–1949: A.C. RHODES
 1950–1952: W.B. CAMERON
 1953–1972: A. TROMBLEY
 1973–1976: R. RYDER
 1977–1988: B. SPROULE
 1989–1991: B. CARNELL
 1992–1997: B. SPROULE

Attractions 

 North Frontenac Dark Sky Preserve

Education 
Students attend the Clarendon Central Public School in Plevna, ON (JK to Grade 8), the North Addington Education Centre in Cloyne, ON (JK to Grade 12) or the Granite Ridge Education Centre in Sharbot Lake, ON (JK to Grade 12). All schools are part of the Limestone District School Board.

Wildlife 
With the Township consisting of a significant portion of Crown land administered by the Ontario Ministry of Northern Development, Mines, Natural Resources and Forestry, North Frontenac is home to many of Ontario's endangered and threatened animals such as;

Endangered

American eel
American ginseng
Butternut tree
Eastern small-footed myotis
Golden eagle
Lake sturgeon
Mountain Lion
Northern myotis
Tricoloured bat

Threatened

Bank swallow
Barn swallow
Blanding's turtle
Cerulean warbler
Least bittern
Whip-poor-will
Bobolink

In the many lakes, rivers and streams you can find:

Black crappie
Bluegill
Brook trout
Bowfin
Burbot
Common carp
Lake sturgeon
Lake trout
Largemouth bass
Longnose gar
Muskellunge
Northern pike
Pumpkinseed
Rainbow trout
Rock bass
Smallmouth bass
Walleye
White crappie
Yellow perch

References

External links

 

Township municipalities in Ontario
Lower-tier municipalities in Ontario
Municipalities in Frontenac County